This University of Oregon notable alumni includes graduates and current students of the University of Oregon as well as former students who studied at the university but did not obtain a formal degree.

The university opened in 1876 and the first class contained only five members, graduating in 1878. The university has over 195,000 alumni, 10 of whom are Pulitzer Prize winners, and 2 of whom are Nobel laureates.

Academic administration

Architecture and design

Business and finance

Fine arts and entertainment

Film, television and performing arts

Literature

Music

Visual arts

Journalism and media

History and humanities

Military

Politics and law

Heads of state

Governors

Judges

Legislators

Mayors

Diplomats

Other politicians, activists and whistleblowers

Science, technology and psychology

Sports

Basketball

 Tyler Dorsey (born 1996), Greek–American basketball player in the Israeli Basketball Premier League
Roman Sorkin (born 1996), Israeli basketball player in the Israeli Basketball Premier League
 Jamil Wilson (born 1990), basketball player for Hapoel Jerusalem in the Israeli Basketball Premier League

Football
Full list of former University of Oregon players who have played football professionally

Full list of former University of Oregon players who are currently playing in the NFL

Track and field

Other sports

See also 

 Lists of Oregon-related topics
 List of University of Oregon faculty and staff
 Oregon Ducks

Notes

References 

University of Oregon alumni